The Shaheen-I (official codename: Hatf–IV Shaheen), is a Pakistani land-based supersonic and short-to-medium range surface-to-surface guided ballistic missile jointly designed and developed by the joint venture of NESCOM and the National Defence Complex (NDC).

It is dedicated and named after a species of Falcon found in the mountains of Pakistan. The Shaheen I is also designated Hatf IV.

Description

Codename

The JS HQ officially adopted the codename of the missile as "Hatf–IV. It has been reported that it was Prime Minister Nawaz Sharif who suggested the name "Shaheen" by taking a cue from philosopher Iqbal's poetic symbol Shaheen Falcon. After being test fired in 1999, JS HQ officially codenamed the missile as "Hatf–IV Shaheen. Though its variants are now known as Shaheen-I and Shaheen-IA.

Shaheen 1
Shaheen I is a short-range ballistic missile (SRBM) with an optimal range of 750 km and propelled by a two-stage solid-fuel rocket motor. The Shaheen I can deliver either a conventional or a nuclear payload much faster than liquid fuelled missiles such as the Ghauri because it does not need to be fuelled before launch, reducing deployment time significantly.

The Shaheen I is believed to be very accurate; Pakistani military sources state a CEP of 25 to 50 m can be achieved, partly due to a "post-separation attitude correction system." This system would allow the missile to modify its trajectory, improving accuracy and, along with the stealthy warhead shaping, giving some capability to evade missile defence systems. It is based on terminal guidance system technology, which improves warhead accuracy by firing small thrusters to adjust the warhead's trajectory and uses satellite navigation systems to help find the target. Such systems would allow the Shaheen to be used against strategic targets without requiring a nuclear warhead to ensure the target's destruction.

According to other sources, the CEP of Shaheen I is 200 meters.

Shaheen 1A (Hatf IV)
 
On 25 April 2012, Pakistan successfully test-launched an upgraded Shaheen I called Shaheen 1A. The military said in a statement that the Shaheen 1A is a medium-range ballistic missile. It is an improved version of the Shaheen 1 with better accuracy and double the range of its predecessor.

The Pakistani military initially did not publicly reveal the range of the missile which led to media speculation of the true range of the missile. According to a defense analyst in Islamabad, this missile could be equipped with warheads designed to evade missile defense systems. The speed of the Shaheen 1A also provides an extremely high impact speed for nearby targets, enabling it to avoid any anti-ballistic missile defenses that may develop in the immediate region. A western official in Islamabad mentioned that the Shaheen 1A missile seems to have an improved ability to strike at its targets. It also has a more powerful engine, which means that it travels at scramjet speeds and can strike at longer distances than Shaheen-1.

On 25 April 2012, the ISPR revealed more information about the missile. The missile weight is approximately 10,000 kg, slightly heavier than its predecessor and can carry a single 1000 kg warhead. In addition, the Shaheen IA primarily contains sophisticated automated refueling and advanced stealth technology features that were not present in its previous version to avoid detections from radars. All three Shaheen missiles, Shaheen I, Shaheen 1A and Shaheen II are reportedly equipped with the latest PSAC (Post-Separation Attitude Correction) system. This is a unique feature which consists of small thrusters that can adjust the warhead trajectory for greater accuracy and evading anti-ballistic missile defence systems. The features of the missile could also serve as a testbed of features which could be implemented on the yet to be deployed Shaheen III. Shaheen-1 A ( Hatf IV), with a range of 900 km, was test-fired on 17 November 2014.

Operational history
Development on Shaheen program began in 1995 and the program went to National Development Complex bureau of the National Engineering and Scientific Commission (NESCOM). The program was put under Dr. Samar Mubarakmand– a nuclear physicist and a fluid dynamicist who delegated the program to country's scientists and engineers. Necessary fundings for the program were secured by the military, and the development on rocket engine and its eventually testings began to be utilized by the Space Research Commission.

In the memoirs of scientists who worked on the program maintained that "Shaheen was a very difficult program and the development of this system has given maximum accuracy– a 100% capability of destroying its target." The program's original goal was to developed a supersonic missile that it would be impossible for any missile defense system could intercept it. Solid-fuel systems for the guided missiles are very difficult to develop and Pakistani scientists closely monitored the Indian development of the Agni-II missile. The Space Research Commission continued to modifies the designs, and repeatedly tests the Solid-fuel rocket engines on multiple occasions.

The Shaheen-I was test fired on 15 April 1999 by a joint team of NDC and SRC led under Dr. Samar Mubarakmand from the Sonmiani Test Range, which was termed as "highly successfully". At the height of military standoff with India in 2002, another test took place and it was quoted by Information minister Nisar Memon as "part of technical requirements" and unrelated to the military confrontation in Kashmir. On 8 October 2003, the Shaheen-I was again test fired for a third time from an undisclosed location, as the ISPR stated: "The test is part of the ongoing series of tests of Pakistan's indigenous missile systems."

A batch of Shaheen I missiles, enough to equip one regiment/battery, was handed over to the Pakistan Army in 2003 along with mobile launchers. Another was tested on 8 May 2010 The Shaheen 1A was test fired on 25 April 2012. On April 10, 2013, Pakistan tested another Shaheen 1A

See also
 Ballistic missile
 Solid fuel rocket
 NESCOM
 Pakistan and weapons of mass destruction
Related developments
 Shaheen II
 Shaheen III
Related lists
 List of missiles

References

External links
 CSIS Missile Threat - Hatf 4
 StrategyCentre.net - Pakistan’s Long Range Ballistic Missiles: A View From IDEAS
 
 FAS.org article - Hatf-3
 FAS.org article - How Shaheen Was Developed

Short-range ballistic missiles of Pakistan
Military equipment introduced in the 2000s